Vyacheslavka is a rural locality (a settlement) in Pokrovsky Selsoviet, Rodinsky District, Altai Krai, Russia. The population was 190 as of 2013. There are 2 streets.

Geography 
Vyacheslavka is located 44 km north of Rodino (the district's administrative centre) by road. Kalinovka is the nearest rural locality.

References 

Rural localities in Rodinsky District